Kereselidze is a Georgian family name from the Racha region in the north-western Georgia. Kereselidze family name comes from these towns of Racha: Bari, Bokva, Krikhi, Pipileti, Sadmeli, Paravneshi, Kveda Shavra, Gadishi, Shardometi, Tsesi and Tsola. Presently, there are 2699 Kereselidze family names in Georgia.

Notable members 
Leo Kereselidze

References 

Surnames of Georgian origin
Georgian-language surnames